Brockley Lane is a closed railway station in Brockley, south London. It was opened in June 1872 by the London, Chatham and Dover Railway on its Greenwich Park Branch Line. It closed to passengers in January 1917 with the branch, but remained open as a goods station until May 1970 (the Great Northern Railway had constructed a coal depot there in 1883).

The site of the closed station is on Brockley Road, about 140 yards north-east of an open station now on the London Overground named Brockley, at a lower level on the London Bridge to Norwood Junction line, crossing under the former Greenwich Park branch.

The entrance to the station was in use as a shop until it was destroyed by fire in 2004. Short sections of the platforms are still visible at the lineside as are traces of the entrances on both sides of the bridge.  The former stationmaster's residence opposite is now a private dwelling.

Future 
According to the Department for Transport and the Transport for London rail prospectus report released in 2016, it has been listed as one of the Southeastern franchise planned improvements in the document entitled "New interchange at Brockley", suggesting that there might be a case to reopen the station.

A proposal to create a new Brockley Interchange station linking the existing Overground station with restored platforms at the former Brockley Lane site is included in the London Borough of Lewisham's 2019-2041 transport strategy, though with no funding as yet identified for the project.

References 

Disused railway stations in the London Borough of Lewisham
Railway stations in Great Britain opened in 1872
Railway stations in Great Britain closed in 1917
Former London, Chatham and Dover Railway stations